Uniprix is a pharmacy chain founded in 1977 and based in Saint-Leonard, Montreal, Quebec. It operates  under four brands: Uniprix, Unipharm, Clinique Santé and Uniclinique (inside clinics). Combining its four brands, Uniprix is the second-largest pharmacy chain in Quebec (after Jean Coutu)  and is mutually exclusive with the Pharmasave chain in English.

Most Uniprix products are branded as Option+.

The Uniprix name was also used for a Montreal tennis stadium (formerly DuMaurier Stadium) which the chain acquired the naming rights for.

Uniprix also was the name of a chain of popular stores in France, launched by the Nouvelles Galeries in 1928. It later was acquired by its competitor, Monoprix.

On April 12, 2017, it was announced that the Montreal-based McKesson Canada, a subsidiary of U.S.-based McKesson, that already owns 275 Proxim pharmacies, reached a deal to acquire Groupe Uniprix’s 330 pharmacies.

McKesson Canada became the biggest pharmacy group in Quebec by having more outlets than Groupe Jean Coutu, which has 382.

References

External links

Companies based in Montreal
Retail companies established in 1977
Canadian pharmacy brands
Private equity portfolio companies
1977 establishments in Quebec